Communist Party of Turkey or Turkish Communist Party may refer to:

 Communist Party (Turkey, 2014), 2014–2017
 Communist Party of Turkey (modern), founded as the Socialist Power Party in 1993
 Communist Party of Turkey (historical), 1920–1988
 Communist Party of Turkey (Workers Voice), 1978–present
 Communist Party of Turkey/Marxist–Leninist, 1972–present
 Communist Party of Turkey/Marxist–Leninist (Maoist Party Centre), a clandestine political party founded in 1987
 Communist Party of Turkey/Marxist–Leninist (New Build-Up Organization), a clandestine political party, 1978–1994 when it merged into the Marxist–Leninist Communist Party (Turkey)
 Communist Party of Turkey/Marxist–Leninist – Hareketi, a clandestine political party, 1976–1994 when it merged into the Marxist–Leninist Communist Party (Turkey)
 Communist Party of Turkey – Revolutionary Wing, 1980
 Communist Labour Party of Turkey, 1980
 Marxist–Leninist Communist Party (Turkey), 1994
 People's Communist Party of Turkey, 2014–2017
 Socialist Liberation Party or Communist Party of Turkey 1920, 2012–present
 Turkish Communist Party (official), 1920
 United Communist Party of Turkey, 1988–1991

See also
 List of illegal political parties in Turkey